The 43rd District of the Iowa Senate is located in southeastern Iowa, and is currently composed of Johnson County.

Current elected officials
Joe Bolkcom is the senator currently representing the 43rd District.

The area of the 43rd District contains two Iowa House of Representatives districts:
The 85th District (represented by Christina Bohannan)
The 86th District (represented by Mary Mascher)

The district is also located in Iowa's 2nd congressional district, which is represented by Mariannette Miller-Meeks.

Past senators
The district has previously been represented by:

Thomas Mann, 1983–1990
Florence Buhr, 1991–1992
Derryl McLaren, 1993–2001
Hubert Houser, 2002
Joe Seng, 2003–2012
Joe Bolkcom, 2013–present

See also
Iowa General Assembly
Iowa Senate

References

43